The Cape Federation of Labour Unions (CFLU) was a trade union federation in South Africa.

The federation was founded in 1913.  It aimed to represent all workers in the Cape Province, although most of its membership consisted of unions representing white and "coloured" workers.  It initially only attracted three affiliates, including the Amalgamated Society of Carpenters and Joiners.  It was initially led by secretary Joe Dean, who was replaced by Bob Stuart in 1914.

The federation grew significantly under Stuart's leadership, and it survived the start of the 1920s, when many other labour movement organisations collapsed.  By 1926, the following unions were affiliated:

 Amalgamated Engineering Union of South Africa
 Building Trades' Union of the Eastern and Western Provinces
 Butchers' Employees' Union
 Cape Fishermen's Union
 Cape Motor Drivers' Association
 Cape Town and Camp's Bay Tramway Workers' Association
 Iron Moulders' Society of South Africa
 National Union of Furniture Workers
 National Union of the Leather Industry
 Operative Bakers' and Confectioners' Union
 South African Boilermakers' Society
 South African Operative Masons' Society
 South African Typographical Union

In 1930, it merged with the South African Trades Union Council, to form the South African Trades and Labour Council.

References

National trade union centres of South Africa
Trade unions established in 1913
Trade unions disestablished in 1930